God is a monotheist conception of a supreme being and principal object of faith. Gods or deities are  natural or supernatural beings considered divine or sacred, depending on tradition.

God may also refer to:

God (word), the English word

Places
Göd, a town in Pest County, Hungary
God, a WWI British troop nickname for Godewaersvelde, France
Godalming railway station, England, station code GOD

People

Given name
God Nisanov (born 1972), Russian property developer
God Shammgod (born 1976), American basketball player and coach

Nickname
HITEK5000, formerly known as "God", producer of Die Antwoord
Eric Clapton (born 1945), English musician
Gus O'Donnell (born 1952), former UK civil service head
Gary Ablett, Sr. (born 1961), Australian-rules football player
Robbie Fowler (born 1975), English former footballer

Arts, entertainment, and media

Fictional entities
God (The Hitchhiker's Guide to the Galaxy), a sci-fi comedy character
God (The Simpsons), a character in the animated television sitcom
God, a fictional music album by The Beatles in Stephen Baxter's "The Twelfth Album"
Government Of Darkness, a fictional criminal empire in the Japanese Kamen Rider X TV series

Gaming
God (MUD), a senior administrator in a multi-user dungeon
Gates of Discord, an EverQuest game expansion

Music

Groups and labels
God (Australian band), an Australian indie rock band
God (British band), a London-based industrial band
g.o.d (South Korean band), a South Korean boy band

Albums
God (Rebecca St. James album), 1996
God (Rip Rig + Panic album), 1981
God LP, a 2016 album by Inhuman
G.O.D., a 2020 extended play by Virgen María

Songs
"God" (John Lennon song), on the album John Lennon/Plastic Ono Band
"God" (Kendrick Lamar song), 2017
"God" (Tori Amos song), 1994
"God" (Rebecca St. James song), 1996
"God", by Outkast, on the 2003 album Speakerboxxx/The Love Below
"God", by Prince, B-side of single "Purple Rain"
"God", by Relient K, on the 2016 album Air for Free
"God", by Smashing Pumpkins, B-side of single "Zero"
"God", by Weird Owl, on the 2015 album Interstellar Skeletal

Other arts, entertainment, and media
God (play), a 1975 one-act play by Woody Allen
God (sculpture), a 1917 readymade artwork by Elsa von Freytag-Loringhoven
GOD TV, an international Christian broadcaster
G.O.D (web series), a 2019 Indian Telugu-language web series.

Religion
God in Abrahamic religions
God in the Baháʼí Faith
God in Buddhism
God in Christianity
God in Hinduism
God in Islam
God in Jainism
God in Judaism
God in Mormonism

Brands and enterprises
Gathering of Developers, a defunct video game publisher
Goods of Desire, Hong Kong company

Other uses
Guerrillas of Destiny, professional wrestling tag team (sometimes shortened to G.O.D.)
Horned God, a figure in Wicca and other forms of Modern Paganism

See also

Dear God (disambiguation)
God and Satan (disambiguation)
God mode (disambiguation)
Goddess (disambiguation)
Gods (disambiguation)
Good (disambiguation)
My God (disambiguation)
Oh My God (disambiguation)